Martín Eduardo Canales Ramos (born 7 May 1991) is a Chilean former footballer who played as a central defender for clubs in Chile and New Zealand.

Career
A product of Universidad Católica, Canales played at amateur level before joining Santiago Morning. In 2015 he emigrated to New Zealand and played for Hawke's Bay United in the top division for two seasons until 2017.

In the New Zealand football, he coincided with compatriots such as Alexis Cárcamo, Nicolas Zambrano and Eder Franchini.

Personal life
At the same he was a player of Hawke's Bay United, he worked as a football coach and for a boutique winery.

After his retirement, he has managed and performed as a sales broker in an insurance company in his homeland since 2018.

References

External links
 
 
 Martín Canales at ThePlayerAgent.com

1991 births
Living people
Footballers from Santiago
Chilean footballers
Chilean expatriate footballers
Santiago Morning footballers
Hawke's Bay United FC players
Primera B de Chile players
New Zealand Football Championship players
Chilean expatriate sportspeople in New Zealand
Expatriate association footballers in New Zealand
Association football defenders